Dominic Kinnear (born July 26, 1967) is an American soccer coach and former player. On January 18, 2022, he was named an assistant coach by FC Cincinnati, his first coaching role since serving as the interim head coach of the LA Galaxy.

As a player, he began his professional career with Scottish club St Johnstone, and went on to play for several teams in the United States and Mexico, including the San Jose Hawks, San Jose Clash, Tampa Bay Mutiny and Necaxa. He also earned 54 caps with the United States national team.

Kinnear has been involved in coaching MLS teams since 2001. His most notable stint was from 2006 to 2014 with the Houston Dynamo, a club he led to the MLS Cup in 2006 and again in 2007.

Youth career
Kinnear moved to the United States with his family when he was three years old. He grew up in Fremont, California, which he considers to be his hometown. He began playing youth soccer at the age of five before attending John F. Kennedy High School where he played on the boys' varsity soccer team. After graduating from high school, he attended Hartwick College for a single year. As a defender, he scored three goals as Hartwick went to the Final Four.

Club career 

Kinnear moved back to Scotland to try his luck with Scottish Football League club St Johnstone.

United States (1989–94)
In 1989, Kinnear signed with the San Francisco Bay Blackhawks of the Western Soccer League (WSL).  Kinnear remained with San Francisco Bay as the Blackhawks became one of the dominant teams of the era.  In 1990, the WSL merged with the American Soccer League (ASL) to form the American Professional Soccer League (APSL).  That season Kinnear again earned All Star honors.  In 1991, the Blackhawks took the APSL title and in 1992 went to the semifinals of the CONCACAF Champions Cup.  Kinnear again earned All Star honors in 1992.  In 1993, the Blackhawks owner pulled the team from the APSL and moved it to the lower division USISL, renaming the team the San Jose Hawks in the process.  Despite the move to the lower division and a winning season, the Hawks folded at the end of the season.

Kinnear then moved to the Fort Lauderdale Strikers for the 1994 APSL season after a summer trial with English club Bolton Wanderers came to nothing.

Necaxa (1995)
In 1995, Kinnear played a single season with Primera División (First Division) team Necaxa. He scored one goal in five appearances as Necaxa took the Mexican League title.

Return to the United States (1995–2000)
At the end of the Mexican season, Kinnear moved to the Seattle Sounders of the A League just in time to win another league championship.  He signed with the Sounders on August 10, 1995 as a replacement for injured Dick McCormick. In the championship final, he scored the winning penalty kick.

On January 24, 1996, Major League Soccer (MLS) allocated Kinnear to the Colorado Rapids, making him one of the first players in the league.  Kinnear spent the 1996 season with the Rapids.  On December 15, 1996, the Rapids traded Kinnear and a second round draft pick to the San Jose Clash for Paul Bravo and Rafael Amaya.  He later moved to the Tampa Bay Mutiny. He scored six goals and 24 assists in his career in MLS. In February 2001, Kinnear retired and joined the San Jose Earthquakes coaching staff that was led by his former Mutiny teammate Frank Yallop. Kinnear had initially thought he was being recruited to play before Yallop mentioned coaching.

International career 
Kinnear earned 54 caps for the U.S. national team, including many of his country's warm-up games for the 1994 FIFA World Cup, although he was not selected for the final squad.

Coaching career

In 2001, the head coach of the San Jose Earthquakes, Frank Yallop, named Dominic Kinnear as his assistant coach. Together, they helped coach the Earthquakes to the MLS Cup in 2001 and 2003.

In 2004, Frank Yallop left and Kinnear was promoted to head coach of the Earthquakes. He led the Quakes to the MLS Supporters' Shield in 2005.
Kinnear moved to Houston with the rest of the Earthquakes, when the team was renamed the Houston Dynamo.  On November 12, 2006, Kinnear led the Dynamo to their first MLS Cup Championship. On November 18, 2007, the Dynamo won their second MLS Cup in a row, again beating the New England Revolution. Kinnear resigned as head coach of Houston Dynamo effectively as of October 25, 2014, after their last match of the regular season.

Kinnear became the new head coach of San Jose Earthquakes following the conclusion of the 2014 regular season He replaced Mark Watson, who was fired on October 15, 2014. On June 25, 2017, Kinnear was fired as head coach of the Earthquakes and was replaced by Chris Leitch.

Career statistics

International goals

Coaching record

1.Record includes league, cup, playoffs and CONCACAF competitions.

Honors

Player

San Francisco Bay Blackhawks
APSL (1): 1991

Necaxa
Primera División de México (1): 1994–95

Seattle Sounders (USL)
A-League (1995–2004) (1): 1995 A-League

Coach
San Jose Earthquakes
MLS Supporters' Shield: 2005

Houston Dynamo
MLS Cup (2): 2006, 2007
Western Conference (2): 2006, 2007
Eastern Conference (2): 2011, 2012

Assistant Coach 
San Jose Earthquakes
MLS Cup (2): 2001, 2003
Western Conference (1):  2003

See also
List of current MLS coaches
List of United States men's international soccer players born outside the United States

References

External links
Houston Dynamo bio
Extensive profile on Kinnear

1967 births
Living people
American Professional Soccer League players
American soccer coaches
American soccer players
Soccer players from California
Liga MX players
Colorado Rapids players
Fort Lauderdale Strikers (1988–1994) players
Hartwick Hawks men's soccer players
Houston Dynamo FC coaches
LA Galaxy coaches
FC Cincinnati non-playing staff
Major League Soccer coaches
Major League Soccer players
Footballers from Glasgow
St Johnstone F.C. players
San Francisco Bay Blackhawks players
San Jose Earthquakes players
San Jose Earthquakes coaches
San Jose Hawks players
Scottish footballers
Scottish emigrants to the United States
Seattle Sounders (1994–2008) players
Tampa Bay Mutiny players
USISL players
United States men's international soccer players
CONCACAF Gold Cup-winning players
1991 CONCACAF Gold Cup players
1992 King Fahd Cup players
1993 Copa América players
1993 CONCACAF Gold Cup players
Western Soccer Alliance players
Club Necaxa footballers
American expatriate sportspeople in Mexico
Expatriate footballers in Mexico
LA Galaxy non-playing staff
San Jose Earthquakes non-playing staff
Association football defenders
Scottish expatriate sportspeople in the United States
Expatriate soccer players in the United States
Scottish expatriate footballers
Scottish expatriate football managers